Micah P. Hinson and the Opera Circuit is an album by Micah P. Hinson, released in 2006.

Track listing
 "Seems Almost Impossible" (Hinson) – 3:40
 "Diggin a Grave" (Hinson) – 2:07
 "Jackeyed" (Hinson) – 3:45
 "It's Been So Long" (Hinson) – 3:02
 "Drift Off to Sleep" (Hinson) – 4:35
 "Letter From Huntsville" (Hinson) – 1:54
 "She Don't Own Me" (Hinson) – 5:40
 "My Time Wasted" (Hinson) – 2:13
 "Little Boys Dream" (Hinson) – 4:21
 "You're Only Lonely" (Hinson) – 5:40
 "Don't Leave Me Now!" (Hinson) – 5:25

Personnel

Micah P. Hinson - Acoustic, Electric, Slide and Bass Guitar, Vocals, Banjo, Mandolin, Percussion, Accordion, Organ and Piano
Charles Lee - Cello 
Nick Phelps - Banjo and Sitar
H. DaMassa - Harmonica
Jason Parker - Trumpet
Chris Holt - Electric and Acoustic Guitar and Fender Rhodes
Tom Hagerman - Violin and Viola
Robert Partin - Accordion
Luke "Dick Burns" Senter - Trap Kit
Robert F. Johnson - Vocals 
Nathan Sudders - Guitar (Bass)
Kenton Asche - Trombone
Jason Kellett - Trap Kit
Eric Bachmann - Saxophone String and Horn Arrangements
Micah P. Hinson - Arranger, Producer, Engineer, Sampling, Coordination and Photography
Tommy Bridwell - Mixing
Tom Knott - Mixing
Jeff Holbert - Mixing
Noel Summerville - Mastering 
Ms. Emily Rupp - Writer
Madamoiselle Antoinette - Model

Micah P. Hinson albums
2006 albums
Jade Tree (record label) albums